Wang Minhui (born 28 October 1960) is a Chinese water polo player. He competed in the men's tournament at the 1988 Summer Olympics.

References

External links
 

1960 births
Living people
Place of birth missing (living people)
Chinese male water polo players
Olympic water polo players of China
Water polo players at the 1988 Summer Olympics
Water polo players at the 1982 Asian Games
Water polo players at the 1986 Asian Games
Water polo players at the 1990 Asian Games
Asian Games gold medalists for China
Asian Games medalists in water polo
Medalists at the 1982 Asian Games
Medalists at the 1986 Asian Games
Medalists at the 1990 Asian Games
Chinese water polo coaches
China men's national water polo team coaches
Water polo coaches at the 2008 Summer Olympics
20th-century Chinese people